Bernard Stjepanović (born 22 December 1988) is a Slovenian football midfielder who plays for FC Obdach.

External links
 Player profile at NZS 
 Player profile at ÖFB 

1988 births
Living people
Slovenian footballers
Association football midfielders
Slovenian PrvaLiga players
NK Triglav Kranj players
Slovenian expatriate sportspeople in Austria
Expatriate footballers in Austria
Slovenian expatriate footballers